The 2015 LKF Cup was the 9th edition of this annual competition between Lithuanian basketball clubs held 20–22 February in Kaunas. Žalgiris Kaunas won its fifth title three years after its last one.

Participating teams 
Žalgiris Kaunas
Lietuvos rytas Vilnius
Neptūnas Klaipėda
BC Šiauliai
Juventus Utena
Pieno žvaigždės Pasvalys
Dzūkija Alytus
Lietkabelis Panevėžys

Bracket

Quarterfinals

Semifinals

Third Place

Final 

LKF Cup
2014–15 in Lithuanian basketball